The King's School is an independent Anglican, early learning, primary and secondary day and boarding school for boys, located in North Parramatta in the western suburbs of Sydney, New South Wales, Australia. Founded in 1831, the school is Australia's oldest independent school, and is situated on a  suburban campus.

The School has about 2,100 students from kindergarten to Year 12 and about 430 boarders from Years 5–12, making it one of the largest boarding schools in Australia. It is Australia's oldest boarding school.

The school is affiliated with the Headmasters' and Headmistresses' Conference, the Association of Heads of Independent Schools of Australia (AHISA), the Junior School Heads Association of Australia (JSHAA), and the Australian Boarding Schools' Association (ABSA). It is a G30 School and is a founding member of the Athletic Association of the Great Public Schools of New South Wales (AAGPS).

History 
In January 1830, the archdeacon of New South Wales, William Grant Broughton, devised a plan for the establishment of grammar schools in the colony under the governorship of Sir Ralph Darling. The Duke of Wellington assisted in securing royal patronage, the text of which stated that with the authority of King George IV such schools would be named "The King's Schools". It is said, although no documentation exists, that royal sanction was granted by King William IV. The former, opened in January, closed eight months later after the death of its first headmaster, while the Parramatta campus remained open under the stewardship of Robert Forrest, who was appointed headmaster in 1831.

According to The King's School 1831–1981, on opening day, Monday, 13 February 1832, with a handful of pupils. Forrest was paid a salary of £100 per annum, but it was inclusive of a land and housing grant. From fees of £28 and £8 per annum for boarders and day pupils respectively he was expected to maintain boarders and pay the salaries of his assistants, whose fees were £4 per annum for each pupil taught. According to an article in the Australian Historical Society Journal in 1903, enrolment reached over 100 pupils before the end of the first year.

By 1839, Forrest's health had deteriorated and he submitted his resignation. Ill-health caused the school to experience a rapid succession of headmasters in the following decade. William Clarke was appointed headmaster to replace Forrest, and John Troughton was appointed master in charge of boarders. Two years later W. W. Simpson became headmaster, but an epidemic of scarlet fever in 1843 forced his resignation. James Walker, a notable botanist and classical scholar, succeeded Simpson, but ill-health resulted in his resignation in December 1847.

In 1848 Forrest returned to the school, which had now had 60 pupils, but he was again forced to resign due to illness in September 1853. In July 1854, Thomas Druitt was appointed headmaster and established military drill in April 1855, a compulsory subject overseen by W. Bamford. Druitt had been under the impression that his appointment was permanent and he refused to relinquish his position upon the arrival of his replacement, Frederick Armitage, in January 1855. It was not until the intervention of Bishop Frederic Barker in May 1855 that Druitt agreed to stand down.

Under the helm of Armitage, the school experienced a protracted period of expansion in facilities and enrolments, due to his significant wealth, which allowed him to pay for many of the improvements personally. The number of pupils increased to nearly 200, 150 of whom were boarders. Pupils studied for seven hours per day in summer and six hours in winter. As well as religious holidays, there were two official school holidays per year, including a mid-winter vacation from 15 June to 15 July, and a mid-summer vacation from 24 December to 31 January. In 1859 Armitage adopted school arms similar to those of The King's School Canterbury in England, which according to The King's School 1831–1981, was due to the erroneous assumption that the Australian school was named after the English one. He applied for leave in 1862 to attend to his ill wife and to obtain a mathematics degree at the University of Cambridge, but he never returned. By the end of his tenure, he had raised the standard and quality of education to a high level.

The acting headmaster appointed prior to Armitage's departure, LJ Trollope, saw a drastic contraction in the number of pupils to just 10 by June 1864, resulting in the closure of the school. There are varying accounts as to the reasons underpinning the school's rapid and sudden decline, including the school's poor financial situation, the dilapidated buildings and competition from other schools, while The King's School 1831–1981 claims that it was a series of successive rainstorms causing the collapse of the schoolroom roof that forced its closure. Other accounts have blamed Armitage as lacking the discipline to continue as headmaster. The Australian Dictionary of Biography argues that while the departure of Armitage was not ideal, "a headmastership devoid of endowment or guaranteed salary in a colonial school without a council or adequate financial support could hardly have been attractive to a scholarly English gentleman." The school reopened in January 1869 with George Fairfowl Macarthur as Headmaster. Macarthur had been a pupil at The King's School during its early years.

Campus 

The King's School originally rented Harrisford House in George Street, Parramatta, near the wharves on Parramatta River. The school soon outgrew its campus in George Street, and following a submission to the Crown, it was provided with land and premises further upriver in Parramatta, close to the Government House. The school remained there for 130 years until August 1968 when it completed its relocation to the current site in North Parramatta, originally Gowan Brae, the family residence and property of James Burns, co-founder of Burns Philp and Company. Since the relocation, the school maintained a  site, while other sections of Gowan Brae were sold to Redeemer Baptist School and Tara Anglican School for Girls, with as well as the NSW Synod of the Uniting Church as the Uniting Theological College. A further section was sold for residential development, now the locality of Kingsdene in the suburb of Carlingford. A small patch of land is still owned by Burns and his descendants, and this is for the family cemetery at the centre of the Senior School.

The senior school (years 7–12) is located on the east of the property, while the preparatory school (K–6) is located on the west of the property.  Within the senior school, there are extensive facilities, including the Centre for Learning and Leadership, dining hall and separate buildings for visual arts, music, science, drama, agriculture, PDHPE and industrial design and technology. Futter Hall, the main school hall, and the staff centre adjacent to it are other facilities present in the academic precinct, known as 'the Quadrangle'. There are 35 classrooms, all equipped with audio-visual and computer facilities. The school theatre was renovated in June 2010, adding a second smaller theatre and drama classrooms. The school also opened its new $20 million science centre in March 2014, which includes classrooms and labs where students can work with collaboratively with researchers from The University of Sydney.

Sporting facilities include 15 playing fields used for both cricket and rugby union, 14 tennis courts, 12 basketball courts (nine outdoor, three indoor), 7 football fields, a 50-metre lap pool, a 25-metre swimming pool, a diving pool, and a gym under which there is an indoor rifle range. The Sports Centre opened in 2007 and includes two basketball courts, a fully equipped gym and fitness centre, and PDHPE classrooms. The school also has a rowing facility in Putney on the Parramatta River.

There are also a number of boarding houses for students who reside at the school, and private residences adjacent to the boarding houses for teachers and their families who provide pastoral care for these boys.

Other features of the school include an agricultural yard, greenhouse, a dam, vineyard, bamboo forest, a mountain biking course, and a number of heritage landmarks.

House system

Senior school 

Until 2011, the school had 14 houses, for both day students and boarders. The boarding houses comprised Gowan Brae, Baker, Bishop Barker, Broughton, Forrest, Hake Harris, Macarthur and Waddy, and the day student houses Britten, Burkitt, Dalmas, Kurrle, Macquarie and Wickham. In that year, the school made a number of changes to its house system, which now consists of six day houses and five boarding houses. The boarding houses are Gowan Brae (for year 7 day students and boarders), Baker-Hake, Bishop Barker-Harris, Broughton-Forrest, Macarthur-Waddy, and the day student houses are Britten, Burkitt, Dalmas, Kurrle, Macquarie and Wickham. The houses are hubs for students' recreational and pastoral activities. During the course of a year, inter-house competitions take place where students earn points for their respective house by competing in events. The winning house at the end of the year receives the King's Cup.

Kurrle and Wickham were created as a result of an expansion in enrolments in 2001, and the remaining Houses have been in existence for several decades. Their names are derived from former Headmasters and Deputy Headmasters, the founder of the school (Broughton), and the traditional name of the school site (Gowan Brae).

Preparatory school 
The preparatory school has four houses: Stiles, Thomas, Blaxland and Harrison. Blaxland includes both boarders and day students, and boarders are housed within Gowan Brae, which is shared with Year 7 students. Each year there are competitions between the four houses such as athletics competitions and swimming carnivals.

Gowan Brae serves as an intermediate step between primary and secondary schooling, allowing Year 7 students the opportunity to adapt to the unique institutions of the senior school while remaining within a common peer group of similar age.

King's also operates a co-educational preparatory boarding school, Tudor House, in Moss Vale, in the Southern Highlands of New South Wales which is approximately 100 kilometers south west of the North Parramatta campus.

Uniform 
The school uniform is the oldest military uniform still worn in Australia and is highly distinctive. It consists of a jacket made of a black and white woollen material, stitched in a birdseye pattern, navy blue trousers with a vertical red stripe, a white shirt and black shoes. The standard school jacket has red cuffs and collar tabs. The cuffs and epaulets are each surmounted by a braided red "Lovers' Knot". The uniform reflects the military history of the school, and is similar to the blazers worn at the Battle of Waterloo. 

The jacket may be modified in a number of ways.

Military insignia can be stitched onto the right arm to show rank in the Australian Army Cadets, a white lanyard may be worn by members of the Marching Band, and the Regimental Sergeant Major may wear the Coat of Arms patch on the left arm. Cadet Under Officers wear a different grey jacket, which has diamond lozenges on the shoulder tabs and silver braided 'Lover's Knot' cuffs.

Most students wear one badge on a red tab on the right collar of the jacket. This is because students of lower rank would have carried rifles over one shoulder, and an additional badge would have been damaged or damage the rifle. House monitors wear two badges on the red tabbed collars of the jacket. School monitors (or prefects) wear two badges on the blue tabbed collars of the jacket. The school captain wears two crown badges on the blue tabbed collars of the jacket. All the buttons are silver in colour, and are manufactured by Stokes & Sons (now Stokes Badges). Monitors, school monitors and the school captain have two badges as they would have been armed with pistols.

The grey jacket and blazers must be worn with a standard black tie commemorating the death of Queen Victoria (although this was temporarily substituted in 2007 during the 175th anniversary by a navy-blue silk tie, with the King's crest and the number 175 scattered on it).

On some occasions, senior students in Years 11 and 12 are allowed to wear a white pin-striped navy blue blazer (known as a butchers coat), and students that have achieved honours colours are permitted to wear a sky-blue "honours blazer". Both blazers have pockets that may have special stitching commemorating academic, sporting or cultural achievements in the form of honours, full or half colours. Outstanding achievement is rewarded by honours colours and is signified by the sky-blue blazer and gold embroidery on the blazer's pocket in the area of achievement. Full colours are represented by white embroidery and half colours are shown by dark blue embroidery on the pocket of the pin-striped navy blue blazer.

Historically, the school uniform was available to purchase from select department stores (David Jones, Farmers and Peapes). Students now purchase their uniforms from the school uniform shop called the Braeside Shop.

The preparatory school uniform differs slightly from that of the senior school. Students from Kindergarten to Year 2 wear navy-blue shorts with the vertical red stripe, knee-high black socks and a white pin-striped navy blue (butchers coat) blazer, while students from Years 3–6 wear the same shorts and socks, but with the grey blazer of the senior school.

Co-curricular activities 
Co-curricular activities offered by the school include debating, choir, theatre, bands and ensembles, sport, and the Duke of Edinburgh Award Scheme. Clubs for senior students (the Twelve Club, the Cartesian Club, the Scipionic Circle, and the Tom Barrett Society) meet once a month, to discuss the current affairs and present papers on topical issues.

The school produces at least one musical and two drama productions each year. Productions have included Les Misérables, The Pirates of Penzance, South Pacific, Guys and Dolls, Fiddler on the Roof, My Fair Lady, The Mikado, Grease, Jesus Christ Superstar (2015), Addams Family (2016), A Fleeting Night's Dream (2017), We Will Rock You (2018), The Producers (2019), Grease (2020), Mamma Mia (2021) and School of Rock (2022).

Academic clubs 
The headmaster, deputy headmaster, and other senior staff host intellectual clubs composed of high achieving students from year 11 and 12. The clubs include the Twelve Club, hosted by the Headmaster, The Cartesian Club hosted by the Deputy Headmaster, the Scipionic Circle, hosted by the Director of Student Services, and the Tom Barrett Society, hosted by the school Registrar. The members of these clubs are selected on the basis of achievement in academics, leadership and character.

Debating 
The preparatory school competes in the IPSHA and ISDA debating competitions, and the senior school in the GPS and ISDA competitions. The school won the ISDA competition, the largest independent schools competition in NSW, for the first time in 2004. The school has also won the GPS tournament twice - once in 1957, and tied first with Sydney Grammar School in 2007. The school was represented by national and world championship winning representative teams in 2004.

Cadet corps 

Founded in 1868, the cadet corps vies with Newington College as the oldest in Australia. All students in Years 9 and 10 are required to undergo cadet training, during which they are taught survival techniques, abseiling, map-reading, marching, and other skills. Each year the annual field exercise, or  "Corps Camp", is held at the Singleton Military Area. The Corps is regarded as the largest unit from any single school.

The Cadet Corps holds an annual passing-out parade, which commemorates the departure of the Year 12 members and the transfer of student leadership to Year 11 through the handing over of the unit colours. It is usually presided over by a high-ranking member of the Australian Defence Force.

The King's School Marching Band is a central element of the cadet corps. The Band consists mainly of members of the School's Symphonic Band, and it marches annually at the ANZAC Day Parade in central Sydney. The Band is overseen and directed in partnership with the Music Department, and incorporated into two platoons under the Cadet Corps command structure. There is an annual appointee to the position of Drum Major – generally a year 12 boy who demonstrates musical skill and leadership capability.

Music 
The school has a music program that caters for a range of musical abilities, held in the sesquicentenary music building. Music at the school forms part of the curricula and co-curricula programs. The school has two pipe organs: a chapel organ in the memorial chapel and a large baroque pipe organ in Futter Hall.

Curriculum
Year 7 students complete the mandatory 100-hour Board of Studies (NSW) music course, which introduces them to basic concepts of music in a variety of styles. Year 7 boys participate in a singing program and undertake a theory exam toward the end of the year. As part of the Year 8–10 elective program, students can continue to study music in these years. They are required to learn an instrument as part of this course and regular performance assessments take place. For the HSC, students can continue their music studies in either the Music 1 or Music 2 courses, with the option of choosing Music Extension as well. Music 1 and 2 cover a variety of music styles, however, the Music 2 course has a focus on Western art music. Recently the school has been successful in this field, with a number of student performances and compositions nominated for ENCORE.

Co-curricular program
The school has seven large Wind Bands, which form the core of the Wind, Brass and Percussion program. The Symphonic Band is the school's elite level band and is composed of musicians typically studying AMEB or Trinity Grade 7 and above. The Wind Orchestra is the middle ensemble within the senior school, whilst Gowan Brae Band is a special ensemble for year 7 students only, which receives extra attention and allows students to develop their talents intensively upon their arrival at King's. The marching band includes members of the Symphonic Band who are enrolled as cadets in The King's School cadet corps. In the Preparatory school, the Concert Band, Wind Ensemble and Junior Band complete the 3-12 wind bands program. The school also runs three stage bands, and numerous other jazz and chamber ensembles for Wind and Brass players. The King's School is particularly renowned for its 'Drumline', a percussion ensemble in the American tradition in which outstanding percussion students perform memorised precision drumming routines, in military-style formation.

The school has a chamber string orchestra for experienced players.

There is a non-auditioned choir for boys in the senior school, and the auditioned Schola Cantorum (Latin: meaning "school of singers"); both ensembles are in four vocal parts.  In the preparatory school there are three choirs consisting of trebles and altos.

A number of small ensembles exist including piano trios, guitar ensembles, percussion ensembles, flute ensembles, clarinet quartet, saxophone quintet and a number of popular music bands.

Instrumental lessons
Full and half-period instrumental lessons are offered in piano, pipe organ, guitar, violin, viola, violoncello, contrabass, tuba, horn, trombone, trumpet, saxophone, flute, clarinet, percussion (orchestral and drum-kit), bagpipes, and voice, are available. The school has a variety of music tutors.

Regular concerts and events
The Music Department conducts a number of regular events each year, including the annual Festival of Lessons and Carols, Gala Concert, ensembles concerts, and studio recitals for individual performances. Most events are held in either the Recital Room (part of the Sesquicentenary music building) or Futter Hall.

Sport 
Sport is compulsory for all students. Senior school students must participate in one of rugby union, association football, volleyball or cross country in winter, and rowing, cricket, basketball, tennis, athletics or swimming in summer. If personally selected by the sportsmaster, students may represent the school at shooting outside their regular sporting commitments. Students may participate in a sport in which they have achieved excellence (deemed by the sportsmaster). Cricket, rugby union, association football, basketball and tennis is also available at the preparatory school. The school engages in these sports as a member of the Athletic Association of the Great Public Schools of New South Wales) with other schools: Saint Ignatius' College, St Joseph's College, Sydney Boys High School, Sydney Grammar School, Sydney Church of England Grammar School (Shore), Newington College, The Scots College and The Armidale School.

Rugby union
The school was instrumental in the development of rugby union in Australia, playing in the first inter-school game against Newington College in 1870. The school has produced 28 Wallabies and four of them have been captains. In 1880 members of the school rugby team also participated in the first recorded soccer match in Sydney against the Wanderers Club. On their 1888 tour of New Zealand and Australia, the British and Irish Lions drew against a team from the school. The rugby union 1st XV has won several GPS Premierships in recent years, including those in 1997–2000, 2002, 2008, 2009 and 2018. The team won the 2000 Sanix World Rugby Youth Tournament in Japan. Current and recent Wallabies Stirling Mortlock, Benn Robinson, Dean Mumm, Nick Phipps and Julian Huxley are former students of the school. Other former students including Ben Batger, Daniel Halangahu, Will Caldwell, James Hilgendorf, Ben Hand, Tom Carter, Mitchell Chapman, Hugh Perrett, Lalakai Foketi, Guy Millar and Tim Davidson play in the Super Rugby competition. Greg Jeloudev and Dylan Pietsch play for Australia in the World Rugby Sevens Series. Daniel Conn plays rugby league for the Sydney Roosters in the NRL.

The Australian Broadcasting Corporation reported on 19 May 2016 that RSPCA Australia was investigating alleged cruelty to sheep after a video was posted on Facebook showing members of the school's teams tackling older rams around a paddock.  The principal of the school likened it to "shearing".

Rowing
In rowing, the school has won the GPS Head of the River 18 times, including in 2006, 2007, 2021 and the Schoolboy VIII at the National Rowing Championships in 1982, 2001, and 2006. The school won the Princess Elizabeth Challenge Cup at the Henley Royal Regatta in 2001 and the Fawley Challenge Cup in 2006.

The school has Old Boys' rugby and football clubs for past students.

Controversy

Bullying and sexual misconduct 
In 2011, a teacher was arrested for possession of images of child abuse, however, they were not of students from the school.

In 2014, students filmed and uploaded an incident where a student rubbed their genitals on another boy's face. The Child Abuse Squad investigated the incident and a student was expelled.

In 2016, the Royal Commission into Institutional Responses to Child Sexual Abuse found that the school had helped an alleged abuser move to another private school by withdrawing from the school rather than being expelled or suspended, making it easier to transfer to another school. The royal commission found that the alleged abuser had ejaculated onto the victim's sleeping bag during a school camp which led to months of bullying and the school had not reported the incident to the police.

Animal cruelty 
In 2016, the Australian Broadcasting Corporation obtained footage of the school's rugby team crash-tackling sheep in a farm paddock. The headmaster at the time, Timothy Hawkes, defended the incident, stating that it was a "rugby camp training exercise not dissimilar to shearing". RSPCA Australia attended the school to investigate the incident.

COVID-19 
In July 2021, a staff member was reported to the police for violating public health orders and attending an anti-lockdown protest, including posting about the experience to social media. The staff member was suspended from the school.

In October 2021, the school was the only school in NSW to refuse a mask mandate during the COVID-19 pandemic. The headmaster Tony George stated that "NSW Education Department guidelines are primarily intended for NSW public schools", but as the school is independent, it only had a legal obligation to follow public health orders.

Jobkeeper 
The school came under fire for claiming the JobKeeper subsidy, handed out by the government during the COVID-19 pandemic to help protect jobs. The private school claimed $8m in JobKeeper subsidies, despite delivering a surplus without the subsidy, largely due to high school fees.

School spending 
In 2022, the school came under scrutiny over the school's spending and lack of transparency, after it approved a trip to fly business class for the school's headmaster Tony George, deputy and both of their wives to fly to watch the King's First VIII race in the Princess Elizabeth Challenge Cup. It was later revealed that the school had also approved a plan to build a plunge pool for the headmaster's residence.

Notable alumni
See List of old boys of The King's School, Parramatta

See also 

 Old King's School, Parramatta
 List of non-government schools in New South Wales
 List of boarding schools in Australia
 GPS Schools
 Tudor House School
 G30 Schools

References

External links 
 
 ISDA Debating website

Boarding schools in New South Wales
Educational institutions established in 1831
Private primary schools in Sydney
Private secondary schools in Sydney
Anglican schools in Sydney
Member schools of the Headmasters' and Headmistresses' Conference
Boys' schools in New South Wales
Junior School Heads Association of Australia Member Schools
1831 establishments in Australia
History of education in Australia
Schools in Parramatta
Athletic Association of the Great Public Schools of New South Wales
North Parramatta, New South Wales